The National Shooting Center, known as the Olympic Shooting Centre during the 2016 Summer Olympics, is a firing range in Deodoro, Rio de Janeiro, Brazil. The range was opened in 2007 and was upgraded to host the sports shooting events for the 2016 Summer Olympics and the 2016 Summer Paralympics.

References

rio2016.com Rio de Janeiro Olympic venues map

Venues of the 2016 Summer Olympics
Olympic shooting venues
Shooting ranges in Brazil
Sports venues in Rio de Janeiro (city)